Tehran Railway Station (Istgah-e Rah Ahan-e Tehran) is located in Rah Ahan Square, at the foot of Valiasr Street in the southern part of Tehran, the capital of Iran. The railway station was originally designed in 1928-29 by a Polish architect Władysław Horodecki who, however, suddenly died before the construction could begin. In 1930 it was then put into the hands of the experienced Danish railway architect Knud Tangaard Seest to finish the project. Around the time it opened in 1930, the previous tram system in Tehran was shut down. K.T. Seest changed the original plans dramatically and gave the railway station a new, highly modern, strict design. Thanks to K.T. Seest the Teheran Railway Station is one of the finest examples of early modernistic architecture in the Middle East.

Service summary
Note: Classifications are unofficial and only to best reflect the type of service offered on each path
Meaning of Classifications:
Local Service: Services originating from a major city, and running outwards, with stops at all stations
Regional Service: Services connecting two major centres, with stops at almost all stations
InterRegio Service: Services connecting two major centres, with stops at major and some minor stations
InterRegio-Express Service:Services connecting two major centres, with stops at major stations
InterCity Service: Services connecting two (or more) major centres, with no stops in between, with the sole purpose of connecting said centres.
International Service: Nakhchivan — Mashhad speed train No. 15/16 operated by Azerbaijan Railways

Gallery

See also
Rahahan Metro Station
List of Tehran Metro stations

References

External links

Railway stations in Iran
Transport in Tehran